Prosveshcheniye ('Enlightenment') was a legal Bolshevik socio-political and literary monthly magazine in Russia.

History and profile
Prosveshcheniye began publication in St. Petersburg in December 1911. Maxim Gorky was editor of the fiction section. 

Its inauguration was proposed by Lenin to  replace the Bolshevik journal Mysl (Thought), a Moscow  publication banned by the tsarist government.

The magazine was banned by the tsarist government on the eve of the First World War in June 1914. One further issue (a double one) appeared in the autumn of 1917.

References

Defunct literary magazines published in Europe
Defunct political magazines
Magazines established in 1911
Magazines disestablished in 1917
Marxist magazines
Monthly magazines published in Russia
Russian-language magazines
Political magazines published in Russia
Defunct magazines published in Russia
Magazines published in Saint Petersburg
Literary magazines published in Russia